Roger Williams & The All Mixed-Up Quartet (the AMUQ) are a Christian rock band based in Tennessee. They signed with Christian label Barner Records in 2010.

Current Members:
 Roger Williams (Vocals, Guitar)
 Andy Blanchard (Bass, Violin)
 James "Earl" Greene (Mandolin, Guitar)
 Will Carter (Electric Guitar)
 Ben Bolden (Drums)
Their first major release is titled A Different Road and was produced by Dove Award winning and Grammy nominated producer Travis Wyrick.

Discography 
 6 Hearts, 12 Shoes, 1 King - (independent)
 These Are The Days, These Are The Times - (independent)
 25 Paces - 2004 (independent)
 The Coffee House Collection - (independent)
 Out of the Way - (independent)
 Free - 2008 (independent) 
 A Different Road - 2010 (Barner Records)

References

External links 
 Official webpage: theAMUQ.com

Christian rock groups from Tennessee